Isle of Thanet was a county constituency which returned one Member of Parliament (MP) to the House of Commons of the Parliament of the United Kingdom from 1885, until it was abolished for the February 1974 general election.

It was located on the Isle of Thanet, in Kent.

Boundaries 
1918–1950: The Boroughs of Margate, Ramsgate, and Sandwich, the Urban District of Broadstairs and St Peters, and the Rural District of Isle of Thanet.

1950–1974: The Boroughs of Margate and Ramsgate, the Urban District of Broadstairs and St Peters, and in the Rural District of Eastry the parishes of Acol, Minster, Monkton, St Nicholas at Wade, and Sarre.

Members of Parliament

Election results

Elections in the 1880s 

King-Harman's death caused a by-election.

Elections in the 1890s

Elections in the 1900s

Elections in the 1910s 

General Election 1914–15:

Another General Election was required to take place before the end of 1915. The political parties had been making preparations for an election to take place and by July 1914, the following candidates had been selected; 
Unionist: Norman Craig
Liberal:

Elections in the 1920s

Elections in the 1930s 

General Election 1939–40

Another General Election was required to take place before the end of 1940. The political parties had been making preparations for an election to take place and by the Autumn of 1939, the following candidates had been selected; 
Conservative: Harold Balfour
Liberal: Richard Pope-Hennessy
Labour: FW Mellanby

Elections in the 1940s

Elections in the 1950s

Elections in the 1960s

Elections in the 1970s

References 

 
 

Parliamentary constituencies in Kent (historic)
Thanet
Constituencies of the Parliament of the United Kingdom established in 1885
Constituencies of the Parliament of the United Kingdom disestablished in 1974